The Pacific Plaza Towers are residential condominium  skyscrapers located across One McKinley Place in Bonifacio Global City, Philippines. The twin 53-storey buildings, the North Tower and South Tower, were completed  in 2001 and rise to 179 metres (587 feet) from the ground to their architectural top. They are currently the 20th and 21st-tallest buildings in the country and Metro Manila as well.

History 
Pacific Plaza Towers began groundbreaking and excavated in 1997, with first concrete pouring in 1998. It began to rise in January 1999; the South Tower was topped off in January 2000 and the North Tower two months later. It was completed in September 2000. It held its soft opening on February 22, 2001 and was inaugurated on March 9, 2001. Notable guests like Former President Corazon Aquino, then-BCDA chairman Rogelio Singson, then-Alaska Milk Corporation head Wilfred Uytengsu Sr. with his son Wilfred Jr. and his wife Kerri were invited at the Inauguration. It took the record of being the Tallest twin-towers in Philippines from Salcedo Park Twin Towers from 2001 to 2009, until The St. Francis Shangri-La Place was completed. From 1997-2001, Metro Pacific Corporation owns the site until its joint ownership with Pacific Plaza Towers Condominium Corporation until 2006 when it became Metro Pacific Investments Corporation and PPTCC is now the sole ownership.

Popular culture
 In 2006, it is featured on Imago's Taralets Music Video as a background alongside One McKinley Place

Gallery

References

External links
 Pacific Plaza Tower at Condo Specialist

|-

Skyscrapers in Bonifacio Global City
Residential skyscrapers in Metro Manila
Residential buildings completed in 2001
Twin towers
Arquitectonica buildings